The 1985–86 UCLA Bruins men's basketball team represented the University of California, Los Angeles in the 1985–86 NCAA Division I men's basketball season. The team was led by freshman point guard Pooh Richardson and finished in 4th place in the conference with a 15–14 record. The Bruins played for the second time ever in the NIT but lost the game to the UC Irvine Anteaters in the first round.

Starting lineup

Roster

Schedule

|-
!colspan=9 style=|Regular Season

|-
!colspan=9 style=| NIT

Source

Schedule and results
 November 24, 1985 – UCLA lost to North Carolina 107–70 in Chapel Hill.
 December 21, 1985 – UCLA defeated Miami (Florida) 109–64 in Pauley Pavilion
 March 13, 1986 – In the first-round game of the NIT, the Bruins were defeated 80–74 by UC Irvine. Reggie Miller scored 16 points.
 The Bruins were 4th in the Pacific-10.

Notes
 Jack Haley died on March 16, 2015, at 51 years old.

References

UCLA Bruins men's basketball seasons
Ucla
Ucla
NCAA
NCAA